The Dominican Rugby Federation, known as Fedorugby — or officially in Spanish: Federación Dominicana de Rugby, is the governing body for rugby union in the Dominican Republic. It was founded on 20 October 2004 and became affiliated to the North America Caribbean Rugby Association (NACRA) in the following year.

Rugby was introduced to the Dominican Republic in 1972 by Jean-Paul Bossuge, a French diplomat. The game began to grow, particularly within the universities, and by the 1970s the original Dominican Rugby Union had been formed with Dr. William Acosta appointed as its inaugural president. Dominican teams began competing in domestic and international tournaments and by the 1980s there were ten active clubs. However, rugby was not officially recognised by the Dominican Olympic Committee and funding for the game was low. Interest waned by the early 1990s. 

Dominican Rugby was revived in 1997 with teams being sent to Trinidad and Tobago's rugby sevens tournament from 1997 to 2000. Recognising a need to retain and increase player numbers, Fedorugby was formed in 2004 to bring the Dominican rugby clubs and players together under one organising body.

National teams
The Dominican national sevens team has played in regional competitions such as Trinidad and Tobago's Rugby Sevens tournament.

See also
Rugby union in the Dominican Republic
Dominican Republic national rugby union team
Dominican Republic national rugby union team (sevens)

External links
 Fedorugby Official website

References

Rugby union in the Dominican Republic
Dominican Republic
Rugby